Wanblee (Lakota: Waŋblí Hoȟpi; "Golden Eagle Nest") is a census-designated place on the Pine Ridge Indian Reservation, located in Jackson County, South Dakota, United States. The population was 674 at the 2020 census, virtually all of whom are members of the Oglala band of Lakota Sioux. Wanbli is the Lakota word for eagle, and the town was named for its proximity to Wanbli hohpi paha (Eagle Nest Butte). Wanblee is a few miles directly northeast of the North American continental pole of inaccessibility.

The 1992 movie Thunderheart was partly filmed in Wanblee. It appeared as an unnamed town on the fictional Bear Creek Reservation, for which is actually located on the Pine Ridge Indian Reservation.

Geography
Wanblee is located in south-central Jackson County at  (43.569908, -101.659567). South Dakota Highway 44 passes through the community, leading east  to White River and northwest  to Interior. Kadoka is 28 miles to the northeast via Highways 44 and 73.

Craven Creek runs through the west side of the community, leading north to the White River.

Wanblee has been assigned the ZIP code 57577.

Demographics

As of the census of 2000, there were 641 people, 132 households, and 107 families residing in the CDP. The population density was 287.0 people per square mile (111.0/km2). There were 144 housing units at an average density of 64.5/sq mi (24.9/km2). The racial makeup of Wanblee was 97.19% Native American, 2.34% White, and 0.47% from two or more races.

There were 132 households, out of which 50.8% had children under the age of 18 living with them, 32.6% were married couples living together, 35.6% had a female householder with no husband present, and 18.9% were non-families. 18.2% of all households were made up of individuals, and 6.8% had someone living alone who was 65 years of age or older. The average household size was 4.86 and the average family size was 5.35.

In the CDP, the population was spread out, with 47.6% under the age of 18, 12.5% from 18 to 24, 21.8% from 25 to 44, 13.4% from 45 to 64, and 4.7% who were 65 years of age or older. The median age was 19 years. For every 100 females, there were 96.6 males. For every 100 females age 18 and over, there were 96.5 males.

About 68.9% of families and 72.3% of the population were below the poverty line, including 72.9% of those under age 18 and 86.2% of those age 65 or over. The per capita income in Wanblee was $4,584. The median income for a household was $14,286, and the median income for a family was $14,844. Males had a median income of $18,750 versus $17,917 for females.

References

Census-designated places in Jackson County, South Dakota
Census-designated places in South Dakota
Pine Ridge Indian Reservation